Ruth Ke‘elikōlani, or sometimes written as Luka Ke‘elikōlani, also known as Ruth Ke‘elikōlani Keanolani Kanāhoahoa or Ruth Keanolani Kanāhoahoa Ke‘elikōlani (June 17, 1826 – May 24, 1883), was a formal member of the House of Kamehameha (founding dynasty of the Hawaiian Kingdom), Governor of the Island of Hawaiʻi and for a period, the largest and wealthiest landowner in the Hawaiian islands. Keʻelikōlani's genealogy is controversial. Her mother's identity has never been in question but her grandfather Pauli Kaōleiokū's relationship to Kamehameha I is heavily disputed. While her father has been legally identified as early as 1864, disputes to that lineage continued as late as 1919. As one of the primary heirs to the Kamehameha family, Ruth became landholder of much of what would become the Bernice Pauahi Bishop Estate, funding the Kamehameha Schools.

Her name Keʻelikōlani means leaf bud of heaven.

Birth, family and early life 

Keʻelikōlani's mother was Kalani Pauahi who died on June 17, 1826 during childbirth after having married the man believed to be her father, Mataio Kekūanāoʻa on November 28, 1825. She was born at Pohukaina near the ʻIolani Palace and hānai adopted by Kaʻahumanu

Maternal ancestry 

Kalani Pauahi, was the daughter of Pauli Kaōleiokū and Keouawahine. Kaōleiokū was one of the three sons of Kānekapōlei that rebeled against their half brother Kīwalaʻō and their uncle Kamehameha I when their father Kalaniʻōpuʻu died and left them no lands. The other two brothers were: Keōua Kūʻahuʻula who started the rebellion and Keōua Peʻeʻale who was speared to death. It was said that Kalani Pauahi was Kamehameha I's granddaughter through her father Kaōleiokū however, in 1935 the Hawaiian Historical Society published their Forty-Third Annual Report (for 1934) with an article by archaeologist, John F.G. Stokes entitled; "Kaoleioku, Paternity and Biographical Sketch", that Stokes believed, if correct, demonstrated that Pauli Kaōleiokū was not a son of Kamehameha l.

Kalani Pauahi's mother Keouawahine was a daughter of Kauhiwawaeono, whose parents were Kekauhiwamoku and Haalou. Haalou was a daughter of Haae-a-Mahi who was also the father of Kamehameha I's mother Kekuʻiapoiwa II.

Kalani Pauahi died from complications due to child birth. While many sources and writers differ on the date and reason, Francisco de Paula Marín had noted in his journal in 1826 the specific day Kalani Puahi died; "17 June. Today died one of the Queens Craypaguaji (Kalanipauahi i.e., Pauahi)". Some years later John Papa ʻĪʻī wrote; "The mother died in childbirth on June 17, 1826", a date that anthropologist Alexander Spoehr agrees with. However professor in Ethnic Studies at the University of Hawaii at Mānoa, Noel Kent, gives the date of Keʻelikōlani's birth as February 9, 1826, a four-month difference. According to Kristin Zambucka author of: "The High Chiefess, Ruth Keelikolani" this was a date Keʻelikōlani supposedly celebrated herself. Professor Seth Archer in his 2018 publication; "Sharks upon the Land: Colonialism, Indigenous Health, and Culture in Hawai'i" lists Pauahi among those that died of a whooping cough outbreak.

Paternital ancestry 

Keʻelikōlani's genealogy has always been controversial and disputed as late as 1919. She is sometimes considered to be of poʻolua ancestry, a child of two fathers.

Kahalaiʻa 

While Keʻelikōlani was the half sister of Kamehameha V, he had always considered her the daughter of Kahalaiʻa, a nephew of Kamehameha I, the son of the king's half-brother Kalaʻimamahu and Kahakuhaʻakoi Wahinepio from Maui. Kahalaiʻa was a kahu (royal attendant) for Kamehameha II. Zambucka states that Kahalaiʻa was caring for Kalani Pauahi while her first husband, Kamehameha II was in England. According to Samuel Mānaiakalani Kamakau, Kalani Pauahi and Kamehamalu, both wives of Kamehameha II, fell in love with him. Kamakau states: "Liholiho had once entertained the notion of disposing of Kahala-iʻa as Kamehameha had of Ka-niho-nui". In Kamakau's version both Pauahi and Kinaʻu were with Kahalaiʻa when the king and queen's remains returned in 1825 and that; "Within a few years Pauahi became the wife of Keku-anaoʻa, and Kinaʻu of Kahala-iʻa. Pauahi was carrying Ruth Ke-ʻeli-kolani at the time, and that is why Ruth was said to be "double headed" (poʻokua) > that is, a child of two fathers".

In May 1824 Kaumualiʻi, the aliʻi nui or "supreme ruler" of Kauaʻi died. Not long afterwards Hiram Bingham I, while on the island, announced that a solar eclipse would occur on June 26 at exactly 12:57PM. Bingham had hoped to use the event to explain it as a simple act of nature and not an omen. Many still saw it as a sign of impending war. Kahalaiʻa was appointed governor of the Island of Kauai and took command of the Russian fort with its fifty mounted canons and ordered armed guards to the tops of its walls. On August 8, 1824, the day after Kalanimoku held a failed council to annex the island, those dissatisfied with the land disbursement went to war. By the wars end Kahalaiʻa had been replaced as governor by Kaikioewa. After being replaced Kahalaiʻa returned to Honolulu and was made kahu hānai of Kauikeaoūli (Kamehameha III). John Papa ʻĪʻī states Kahalaiʻa was sent to Lahaina, Maui for his safety upon Kekūanāoʻa's return as he had supposedly already stated his intention to wed Pauahi.

In 1909 Sheldon Dibble published the date of Kahalaiʻa's death as 1826 however, he places Pauahi's death in 1825. Also in 1906, Thomas G. Thrum's; "Hawaiian Annual" lists Kahalaiʻa's death as 1826 as well however, in their 1922 edition state that Kahalaiʻa had died during the battle. John Fawcett Pogue published an account of the rebellion written by Hawaiian students in his book; "Moolelo of Ancient Hawaii" in 1858. In 2002 Peter R. Mills clarified translations and conclusions from Charles W. Kenn about the writings in which Kenn describes a "sacrifice" interpreted as relating to Kahalaiʻa. Mills noted that the figure had not died during the battle and was not buried at the fort. Archer believed that Kahalaiʻa died of whooping cough in an outbreak in 1826 along with Kalani Pauahi. Kamakau mentions an outbreak of "cough and bronchitis" that killed several people including Pauahi and then goes on to discuss Kalanimoku and Kahalaiʻa's death but not how they died. Kamakau only mentions that Boki took over as the young king's kahu after Kahalaiʻa's death.

Kekūanāoʻa 

John Papa ʻĪʻī  writes that, whether or not Kekūanāoʻa had spoken of Pauahi before leaving for England, it was common knowledge that Kekūanāoʻa had taken Kalani Pauahi for himself immediately upon his return. ʻĪʻī states that the relationship may possibly have stemmed from "illicit relations" prior to the king's death that remained hidden but on Kekūanāoʻa's return the "affair was evident".

Although her paternity was questionable, Mataio Kekūanāoʻa claimed her as his own natural child. He took her into his household after Kaʻahumanu's death and included her in his will and inheritance. This made her the half-sister of King Kamehameha IV and King Kamehameha V and Princess Victoria Kamāmalu.

Kaʻahumanu, Boki and the line of succession 

A dispute between Boki and Kaʻahumanu began in 1829  over the line of succession when a discussion overheard between the Queen-Regent Kaʻahumanu and Kekāuluohi was relayed back to Boki by a royal attendant. Kaʻahumanu had said that Keʻelikōlani could become ruler. Kaʻahumanu believed Kaōleiokū to be Kamehameha's first child, and Pauahi being his daughter made Keʻelikōlani grandniece of Kauikeaouli. Kamakau says this is when Boki conceived plans to overthrow Kaʻahumanu. On June 20 Boki visited with Nahienaena and Kamehameha III and advised the king and his sister to conceive a child in order to disqualify any claims saying; "the chiefs would not dare urge your grandniece as your possible successor!" and then told the king what the attendant had said. When Kaʻahumanu and other's including Kuakini and Hoapili were told of Boki's actions they had harsh words toward Boki calling him; "[T]he one girdled in Kamehameha's intestines", a reference to Kahekili II's hatred towards the king and Boki's rumored paternity. They stated that Kaʻahumanu had a right to decide such things but he did not. This only infuriated the young man who believed himself to be Kauikeaouli's main kahu or guardian, giving him the sole right to council the king as tradition had always given past guardians. Boki was held in high esteem by American and English consuls and felt encouraged in quartering soldiers, including some foreign white settlers, guns and ammunitions in Waikiki. When the news of the rebellion reached Kaʻahumanu most of the soldiers stayed with Boki but members of the church and others came to her aid. Kaʻahumanu was defiant and said that Boki would have to come there himself to kill her and her grandchildren, Keʻelikōlani and David Kamehameha. After hearing about Boki's purpose Charles Kanaʻina and Kekūanāoʻa headed out on horseback to confront Boki but Kanaʻina became nervous and turned back, leaving Kekūanāoʻa, Keʻelikōlani's father, to continue alone. He arrived to a huge gathering of armed people including Boki and his men. When the crowd saw Kekūanāoʻa they shouted out his name and fell silent. He took Boki off to speak with him about his plans to kill Kaʻahumanu. Boki admitted his jealousy of the queen's sway over Kamehameha III but was persuaded to end the dispute and return to his home peacefully.

Line of succession by Order in Council with Kamehameha III 

On June 29, 1844, an "Order in Council of His Majesty King Kamehameha III" designated the first 15 eligible royals with first rights to the throne. This small pool of individuals became pre-emptory heirs in the absence of a constitutional appointment of a successor to the throne. A full list with one additional name was printed in 1847 by the Polynesian, the official government journal; Moses Kekuaiwa, Jane Loeau, Alexander Liholiho, Abigail Maheha, James Kaliokalani, Mary Paaaina, David Kalakaua, Lydia Kamakaeha, Lot Kamehameha, Bernice Pauahi, William C. Lunalilo, Elizabeth Kekaaniau, Peter Y. Kaeo, Emma Rooke, William Kinau Pitt, Victoria Kamamalu Keʻelikōlani was not included in the line of succession.

Defender of tradition 
Ruth was a staunch defender of ancient Hawaiian traditions and customs. While the kingdom became Christianized, Anglicized, and urbanized, she preferred to live as a noble woman of antiquity. While her royal estates were filled with elegant palaces and mansions built for her family, she chose to live in a large traditional stone-raised grass house. While she understood English and spoke it well, she used the Hawaiian language exclusively, requiring English-speakers to use a translator. Although trained in the Christian religion and given a Christian name, she honored practices considered pagan, such as patronage of chanters and hula dancers.

She continued to worship the traditional gods and various aumakua, or ancestral spirits. When Mauna Loa erupted in 1880, threatening the city of Hilo with a lava flow, her intercession with the goddess Pele was credited by Hawaiians with saving the city. When the ruling monarchs asked her to pose for official photographs, she often refused. Only a dozen photographs of Ruth are known to exist.

Considered a beauty in her youth, she gained weight as she grew older, and a surgery for nasal infection disfigured her nose, although rumors circulated that it was her second husband Davis who had broken her nose in one of their many fights.
She came to adopt some modern ways, such as Victorian fashions in hairstyle and dresses. Christian missionaries caused Hawaiian royal women to become self-conscious about their Hawaiian looks. They were uncomfortable with their dark skin and large bodies which had been considered signs of nobility for centuries. No matter how Westernized their manners, they were seen as a "Hawaiian squaw." By the last half of the 19th century, Hawaiian women were going in two different directions. Many European men married Hawaiian women they found exotic, favoring those who were thin and had pale complexions.

Her broad features were accentuated by a nose flattened by surgery for an infection. To add on to her stature, listeners described Princess Ruth's voice as a "distant rumble of thunder." She rejected English and the Christian faith. The U.S. minister to Hawaiʻi Henry A. Peirce dismissed the princess as a "woman of no intelligence or ability." Many Westerners interpreted her clear defense of the traditional ways as backward and stupid.

Government and business 
As the Governor of Hawaiʻi Island and heir to vast estates, she had more political power and wealth than most women in other parts of the world. For example, American women could not even vote at the time. Ruth's assertiveness were characteristic of her ancestors. She hired businessmen  such as Sam Parker and Rufus Anderson Lyman who were descended from Americans to help her adapt to the new rules for land ownership. Instead of selling the land, she offered long-term leases, which encouraged settlers to start successful family farms, and gave her a secure income. She was a shrewd businesswoman. In a notorious case, she sold Claus Spreckels her claims to the Crown Lands for $10,000. The lands were worth $750,000, but she knew her claims to them were worthless, since it had been decided in previous court cases that the lands were only entitled to whoever held the office of monarch.

In 1847 she was appointed to the Privy Council of Kamehameha III, and served from 1855 through 1857 in the House of Nobles. January 15, 1855, she was appointed to be the Royal Governor of the Island of Hawaiʻi, where she served until March 2, 1874.
When her last half-brother Kamehameha V died in 1872 leaving no heir to the throne, her controversial family background prevented her from being a serious contender to be monarch herself. Although she was considered a member of the royal family, along with Queen Emma and the king's father. In 1874, King Lunalilo then died, and the legislature elected Kalākaua as king, the first to be not descended from Kamehameha I. Keʻelikōlani was not declared as a member of the royal family, merely as a high chiefess by the new king. The young William Pitt Leleiohoku was named Crown prince, and history might have been very different if he had lived past 1877 and became a wealthy king. Instead, the increased reliance of the royal family on the treasury and governmental pensions to fund their lavish expenses is generally considered one factor that led to the overthrow of the Kingdom of Hawaii in 1893.

She died at Huliheʻe Palace, Kailua Kona, Hawaiʻi Island, at 9am on May 24, 1883.
Later sources claimed she died on May 15. Her body was shipped back to Honolulu for a royal funeral, and she was buried in the Kamehameha Crypt of the Royal Mausoleum, Mauna ʻAla, in Nuʻuanu Valley, Oahu. This totaled nearly nine percent of the land in the Hawaiian Islands.

Personal life and marriages 
Before the age of sixteen, she married her first husband William Pitt Leleiohoku I (1821–1848), Governor of Hawaiʻi, former husband of Princess Nāhiʻenaʻena, and son of High Chief William Pitt Kalanimoku the Prime Minister of Kamehameha I. Soon after she married Leleiohoku, her 27-year-old husband died in a measles epidemic.

On June 2, 1856, she married her second husband, Isaac Young Davis (c. 1826–1882), son of George Hueu Davis and his wife Kahaʻanapilo Papa (therefore grandson of Isaac Davis). Standing at 6 ft 2 in, he was considered rather handsome by many including foreign visitors such as Lady Franklin and her niece Sophia Cracroft.  Their marriage was an unhappy one, and they divorced in 1868. The early loss of their son did not help.

Children 

She bore two sons, who both died young. John William Pitt Kīnaʻu, son of Leleiohoku, was born on December 21, 1842. He was taken away at an early age to attend the Royal School in Honolulu, and died September 9, 1859. Keolaokalani Davis, son of Isaac Young Davis was born in February 1862 and hānai (adopted) against his father's wishes to Bernice Pauahi Bishop. He died on August 29, 1863, aged one year and 6 months.

Her adopted son, called Leleiohoku II after her first husband, was born January 10, 1854, became Crown Prince of Hawaii, but died April 9, 1877, when only 23 years old. On the death of her adopted son, she demanded that Kalākaua and his family relinquish all rights to the estates she had bequeathed their brother, and that they be returned to her by deed. Her relations with King Kalākaua were distant, although she had close friendships with his sister, Queen Liliʻuokalani, and their mother, Keohokalole.

She was godmother to Princess Kaʻiulani. At Kaʻiulani's baptism, Ruth gifted  of her land in Waikīkī where Kaʻiulani's father Archibald Cleghorn built the ʻĀinahau Estate. Kaʻiulani gave Ruth the pen name of Mama Nui meaning "great mother". Ruth insisted that the princess be raised to one day be fit to sit on the Hawaiian throne. Ruth's death in 1883 was the first of many deaths that Kaʻiulani would witness in her short life.

Personal heir to the Kamehameha line 

Keʻelikōlani was an heir to many of the Kamehameha Dynasty despite her controversial heritage beginning with much of the land holdings of her adopted mother Kaʻahumanu through her father who inherited his daughters holdings that were then passed on to Keʻelikōlani. She was also the sole heir of Kamehameha V and a 1/9 heir to the estate of Charles Kanaʻina's estate along with her cousin Bernice Pauahi Bishop that inherited two - 1/9th shares because her genealogy.

Legacy 
During her life Ruth was considered the wealthiest woman in the islands, owning a considerable amount of land inherited from Kamehameha V and her first husband Leleiohoku I. Her vast estate passed to her cousin Bernice Pauahi Bishop, with much of these lands becoming the endowment for Kamehameha Schools. On these lands downtown Honolulu, Hickam Air Force Base, part of Honolulu International Airport, Moana Hotel, Princess Kaʻiulani Hotel, Royal Hawaiian Hotel, among others, were built.

A documentary film was made of her life in 2004. As a tribute to her traditionalism, a version of the film was produced in the Hawaiian language. In March 2017, Hawaiʻi Magazine ranked her among a list of the most influential women in Hawaiian history.

Ancestry

Honours 
  Dame Grand Cross of the Royal Order of Kamehameha I.

See also 
 Huliheʻe Palace – Kailua-Kona home of Princess Ruth
 Keōua Hale – Palace of Princess Ruth (downtown Honolulu)

Notes

Citations

References 

   Includes letters by Sofia Cracroft, Jane Franklin and Queen Emma of Hawaii.

External links 

Heirs to the Hawaiian throne
Keelikolani, Ruth
Keelikolani, Ruth
Hawaiian princesses
House of Kamehameha
Royalty of the Hawaiian Kingdom
Burials at the Royal Mausoleum (Mauna ʻAla)
Native Hawaiian women in politics
Members of the Hawaiian Kingdom Privy Council
Members of the Hawaiian Kingdom House of Nobles
Governors of Hawaii (island)
Hawaiian adoptees (hānai)
Women governors and heads of sub-national entities